Spirosperma is a genus of annelids belonging to the family Naididae.

The species of this genus are found in Eurasia and Northern America.

Species:
 Spirosperma apapillatus (Lastočkin, 1953) 
 Spirosperma beetoni Brinkhurst, 1965

References

Naididae